ORP Sokół  was a U-class submarine (formerly HMS Urchin) built by Vickers-Armstrong at Barrow-in-Furness. Shortly after launching in September 1940 she was to be commissioned by the Royal Navy as HMS Urchin, but instead was leased to the Polish Navy due to a lack of experienced submarine crews.

Polish service
Shortly after her trials, the boat was handed to her Polish crew, in accordance with the Anglo-Polish military alliance and amendments of 18 November 1939 and 3 December 1940. On 19 January 1941 the Polish banner was raised and the boat, commanded by Commander Borys Karnicki, was moved to Portsmouth. There she spent half a year patrolling the Bay of Biscay off the French port of Brest. In September she was moved to Malta, where she was attached to the 10th Submarine Flotilla. She took part in the naval runs on the Italian ports of Taranto and Naples. She also escorted numerous convoys in the Mediterranean. On 28 October of that year, Sokół achieved her first victory by heavily damaging the Italian auxiliary cruiser Città di Palermo. On 2 November in the Gulf of Naples she sank the 2,469-ton transport ship Balilla, with her sister . On 19 November of the same year, she forced the anti-submarine nets and entered the port of Navarino, where she damaged the Italian destroyer . She was attacked by Italian torpedo boats and destroyers, but all of the depth charges missed and Sokół managed to escape from the harbour, sinking an additional transport steamer (5,600 tons) with three torpedoes. On 12 February 1942 she boarded and then sank the Italian wooden merchant schooner Giuseppina (362 tons) in the Gulf of Gabes.

On 17 April while in the port of Malta, she was heavily damaged by a German air raid and was forced to return to the shipyard in Blyth to receive repairs. By mid-1943 she had returned to the Mediterranean, where she continued to harass enemy shipment off the coasts of Italy, Northern Africa and in the Adriatic. On 12 September she rammed and sank the fishing vessel Meattini (36 tons). She took part in the allied blockade of the naval bases in Naples and Pula. Off the coast of the latter port, transferred by the Italians to Nazi Germany, Sokół sank a munitions transport (probably the 7,095-ton ) and three days afterwards on 11 November the Italian schooner Argentina (64 tons). Between 4 November 1943 and 25 February 1944 she operated in the Aegean from the naval base in Beirut. Among the ships sunk in that period were two transport ships, four schooners and one cutter. In March 1944 both of the "Terrible Twins" left Malta for Great Britain where they were attached to the Dundee-based 9th submarine flotilla. After an additional four patrols off the coast of Norway, in the spring of 1945 she was designated as a training ship and was used by the Royal Air Force for training naval bomber pilots.

Wartime tally
Altogether, during her wartime service Sokół sank or damaged 19 enemy vessels of about 55,000 tons in total. All of the commanding officers of the boat, (Lieutenant Commander Karnicki, Lieutenant Commander Koziołkowski and Captain Bernas) were awarded the Virtuti Militari. The full patrol records of the ORP Sokół are stored at the National Record Office, Kew, England.

Royal Navy service
Returned to the Royal Navy on 27 July 1945 as HMS Urchin, she served for a further four years.

Fate
Urchin was decommissioned in December 1948 and scrapped in September 1949.

References

Bibliography
 
 Andrzej S. Bartelski. Tajemnice polskich Jolly Roger. „Morze, Statki i Okręty". 4/2009. 
 Andrzej S. Bartelski. "Terrible Twins" - czyli polskie okręty podwodne na Morzu Śródziemnym. „Okręty Wojenne". 2/2001. 
 Andrzej S. Bartelski, Rafał M. Kaczmarek. Polskiej wojny podwodnej ciąg dalszy. „Morze, Statki i Okręty". 4/2008. 
 Wojciech Holicki. Okręty podwodne typu U i V. „Nowa Technika Wojskowa". 9/2000 i 10/2000. 
 Jerzy Lipiński: Druga wojna światowa na morzu. Warszawa: 1995. 
 Rafał M. Kaczmarek. Polska wojna podwodna. „Morze, Statki i Okręty". 4/2004 i 6/2004. 
 Jerzy Pertek: Mała flota wielka duchem. Poznań: 1989. 
 Stanisław M. Piaskowski: Okręty Rzeczypospolitej Polskiej 1920-1946. Warszawa: 1996. 
 Jürgen Rohwer, Gerhard Hümmelchen: Chronik des Seekrieges 1939-1945
 Paweł Wieczorkiewicz. Polska Marynarka Wojenna w latach II wojny światowej. „Morze, Statki i Okręty". 3/1998.

External links
ORP Sokół at Uboat.net

British U-class submarines
Ships built in Barrow-in-Furness
1940 ships
World War II submarines of the United Kingdom
British U-class submarines of the Polish Navy
World War II submarines of Poland